Lernakert is a village in the Artik Municipality of the Shirak Province of Armenia. The 10th to 13th-century Makaravank Church, with the church of Surb Sion of 1001 is located 1 mile north of the village. In the gorge below is a small church built on earlier foundations and constructed in the 18th century, with a hermit's cell cut into the cliff face behind.

Demographics

Gallery

See also 
 Shirvan
 Shirvan (city)

References 

World Gazeteer: Armenia – World-Gazetteer.com

Populated places in Shirak Province